Nkongsamba Airport  is an airport serving Nkongsamba, a city in the Moungo department of the Littoral region in Cameroon.

Facilities

References

External links
 

Airports in Cameroon
Nkongsamba